Biderman's Chart of Coercion, also called Biderman's Principles, is a table developed by sociologist Albert Biderman in 1957 to illustrate the methods of Chinese and Korean torture on American prisoners of war from the Korean War. The chart lists eight chronological general methods of torture that will psychologically break an individual.

In spite of the chart's original Cold War application, Amnesty International has stated that the Chart of Coercion contains the "universal tools of torture and coercion". In the early 2000s, the chart was used by American interrogators at the Guantanamo Bay detention camp. It has also been applied to the psychological abuse used by perpetrators of domestic violence.

Origin

Albert D. Biderman, a social scientist with the US Air Force, was assigned to research why many American prisoners of war (POW) captured by Communist forces during the Korean War were cooperating. After extensive interviews with returned POWs, Biderman concluded that there were three major elements behind the Communist interrogators' coercive control: "dependency, debility and dread". Biderman summarized his findings in a chart first published in the paper Communist Attempts to Elicit False Confessions From Air Force Prisoners of War in a 1957 issue of The Bulletin of the New York Academy of Medicine. The paper was an analysis of the psychological, rather than physical, methods used to coerce information and false confessions. 

Psychiatrist Robert Jay Lifton conducted similar research into the same Chinese methods; coining the term "thought reform" (now known as brainwashing) to describe them in the same issue of The Bulletin.

Coercion methods
The chart includes the following coercion methods:
 Isolation
 Monopolization of perception
 Induced debilitation and exhaustion
 Threats
 Occasional indulgences
 Demonstrating "omnipotence" and "omniscience"
 Degradation
 Enforcing trivial demands

Later applications

In a 1973 report on torture, Amnesty International stated that Biderman’s Chart of Coercion contained the "universal tools of torture and coercion".

In 2002, US military trainers offered an entire training class to Guantanamo Bay detention camp interrogators based on Biderman's Chart. Documents revealed to Congressional investigators in 2008 revealed interrogation methods at the camp; The New York Times was the first to recognize that the methods were nearly verbatim those contained in Biderman's Chart.

Biderman's Chart of Coercion has also been applied to domestic violence, with many noting that the psychological methods used by abusive partners are nearly identical to those of the chart.

References

External links
 Communist Attempts to Elicit False Confessions From Air Force Prisoners of War
 Report on Physical Pressures Training, January 15, 2002

Psychological abuse
Guantanamo Bay detention camp
Korean War prisoners of war
Psychological torture techniques